The Helsinki Foundation for Human Rights is the name of non-governmental organizations in a number of countries established under the now defunct International Helsinki Federation for Human Rights.

The organizations include:

Turkmen Helsinki Foundation for Human Rights, established in 2003 in Varna, Bulgaria, to monitor human rights in Turkmenistan
Czech Helsinki Committee

References

Human rights organizations